Kelham Gerard O'Hanlon (born 16 May 1962) is a former professional footballer who played as a goalkeeper for a number of British clubs. Born in England, he represented the Republic of Ireland national team at international level. He is the head coach of SSA Kings in USL League Two.

Club career
O'Hanlon began his playing career at Middlesbrough in 1982. He then joined Rotherham in 1985 and stayed there for six years, before leaving for Carlisle. Two years later he joined Preston although he was only at Deepdale for one season before joining Dundee United in Scotland. He returned to Preston in 1996, making a further fourteen performances.

International career
During his playing career O'Hanlon gained a cap for the Republic of Ireland national team in 1987, keeping a clean sheet in a 5–0 friendly win over Israel.

Coaching and managerial career
Upon retirement from playing O'Hanlon joined the coaching staff at Preston becoming David Moyes' assistant in 1998. He was made caretaker manager in March 2002 after Moyes' departure to Everton, Moyes offered O'Hanlon a position with Everton but he chose to remain at Deepdale, initially as caretaker manager and subsequently as a permanent appointment. In June 2003, O'Hanlon left Preston due to cost-cutting measures and was appointed as a coach at Bury in January 2004, leaving in May 2005, again due to cost-cutting measures. O'Hanlon took up a part-time position in February 2006 with Chester before being appointed as coach at Barnsley in January 2007 where he remained until September 2009 when manager Simon Davey was sacked.

He was appointed first team manager at non-league club AFC Fylde in December 2009 having been assisting as first team coach for three months prior to this. He left the club in October 2011.

He is the head coach of Southern Soccer Academy Kings in USL League Two.

Honours
Individual
PFA Team of the Year: 1991–92 Fourth Division

See also
 List of Republic of Ireland international footballers born outside the Republic of Ireland

References

External links

Living people
Association football goalkeepers
Republic of Ireland association footballers
Middlesbrough F.C. players
Rotherham United F.C. players
Carlisle United F.C. players
Preston North End F.C. players
Dundee United F.C. players
Preston North End F.C. managers
AFC Fylde managers
Republic of Ireland international footballers
Republic of Ireland under-21 international footballers
1962 births
Scottish Football League players
English Football League players
People from Saltburn-by-the-Sea
Chester City F.C. non-playing staff
Bury F.C. non-playing staff
Footballers from North Yorkshire
Tranmere Rovers F.C. non-playing staff
English football managers